Eudo is a masculine given name borne by:

 Odo the Great (died 735–740), Duke of Aquitaine, also called Eudo
 Odo, Count of Penthièvre (c. 999–1079), also Count of Brittany
 Eudo Dapifer (died 1120), Norman aristocrat, steward under William the Conqueror, William II and Henry I
 Éon de l'Étoile (Latin: Eudo de Stella) (died 1150), Breton religious leader and "messiah"
 Eudo la Zouche (died 1279), professional soldier, father of the first Baron Zouche
 Eudo Mason (1901–1969), British professor of German

See also
 Eudes, a related given name
 Odo, a related given name

Masculine given names